The Avenal Solar Facility is a 57.7 megawatt (MW) photovoltaic power station in Kings County, California, constructed using 450,900 SHARP-128W thin-film modules. At its completion, it was California's largest photovoltaic facility.

The power generated is sold to Pacific Gas & Electric, using three separate 20-year power purchase agreements (PPA).

Units 
 Sun City (20MW)
 Sand Drag (19MW)
 Avenal Park (6MW)

Production

See also

 List of photovoltaic power stations
 El Dorado Solar Power Plant
 Renewable energy in the United States
 Renewable portfolio standard
 Solar power plants in the Mojave Desert
 Solar power in California

References

Solar power stations in California
Buildings and structures in Kern County, California
Photovoltaic power stations in the United States
Energy infrastructure completed in 2011
San Joaquin Valley
NRG Energy